Mahmoud El Gendy (also credited as ;  ، February 24, 1945 – April 11, 2019) was an Egyptian comedian actor, and is considered as one of the greatest comedians in Egypt.

See also 

 List of Egyptian films of the 1950s
 List of Egyptian films of the 1960s
 List of Egyptians

References

External links 

 

1945 births
2019 deaths
20th-century Egyptian male actors
Egyptian comedians